Berkley Crossroads Historic District is a historic district in Darlington, Maryland, United States. It is a small rural crossroads community dating from the late 18th century through the early 20th century, and is one of the few remaining rural crossroads in Harford County. The entire area is agricultural in nature, and mostly consists of two- and three-story residences. The earliest structures, dating from the late 18th and early 19th century are of log construction, in whole or in part.  It was also an important 19th century Free Black community.

It was added to the National Register of Historic Places in 2003.

References

External links
, including photo dated 2000, at Maryland Historical Trust
Boundary Map of the Berkley Crossroads Historic District, Harford County, at Maryland Historical Trust

Historic districts in Harford County, Maryland
Historic districts on the National Register of Historic Places in Maryland
African-American history of Maryland
National Register of Historic Places in Harford County, Maryland